was a village located in Ogachi District, Akita Prefecture, Japan.

In 2003, the village had an estimated population of 2,874 and a density of 13.15 persons per km² (34.06 persons per square mile).

On March 22, 2005, Minase, along with the towns of Inakawa and Ogachi (all from Ogachi District), merged into the expanded city of Yuzawa.

External links
 Yuzawa official website 

Dissolved municipalities of Akita Prefecture
Yuzawa, Akita